Life Goes On EP is the third album by the B.E. Taylor Group. It was released by First String Records Inc. The album was produced by Rick Witkowski and Joe Macre and recorded at Beachwood Studios in  Cleveland, Ohio.

Track listing
Side One
"Machine Talk"
"Life Goes On"
"Karen"
"Reggae Rock 'n' Roll"

Side Two
"Machine Talk (Long Version)"
"Dangerous Rhythm"

Personnel
Lead Vocals: B.E. Taylor
Guitars: Rick Witkowski
Drums: Joey D'Amico
Keyboards: Nat Kerr
Bass: Joe Macre
Saxophone: Rick Bell
Live Bass: Jim Spears

1984 EPs